Rubén Alberto Dundo (born 16 December 1967) is a former Argentine naturalized Chilean footballer who played for clubs of Argentina and Chile.

Career
As a youth player, Dundo was with River Plate before starting to play at professional level for Chaco For Ever, but moved to Chile where he would represent 14 clubs, including Magallanes, C.D. Arturo Fernández Vial, Cobresal and Huachipato, before he retired. He scored 40 goals in two seasons with Cobresal.

Personal life
He naturalized Chilean by residence.

Dundo made his home in Chile and has worked as football coach for the Escuela de Fútbol San Miguel, a football academy in the eponymous commune.

His son, Maxi, who was born in Chile, played football for clubs such as Ferroviarios in Chile and Ital-Inter in Canada.

Honours

Club
Rangers 
 Segunda División de Chile (1): 1993

Deportes Iquique
 Primera B (1): 1997 Clausura

Cobresal
 Primera B (1): 1998

Individual
 Primera B Top-scorer (1): 1998

References

External links
 

1967 births
Living people
People from San Isidro, Buenos Aires
Sportspeople from Buenos Aires Province
Argentine footballers
Argentine expatriate footballers
Argentine Primera División players
Chaco For Ever footballers
Nueva Chicago footballers
Primera B de Chile players
Chilean Primera División players
Deportes Magallanes footballers
Rangers de Talca footballers
Deportes Melipilla footballers
C.D. Huachipato footballers
Audax Italiano footballers
C.D. Arturo Fernández Vial footballers
Deportes Iquique footballers
Cobresal footballers
Provincial Osorno footballers
Lota Schwager footballers
Magallanes footballers
Categoría Primera A players
Cortuluá footballers
Argentine expatriate sportspeople in Chile
Argentine expatriate sportspeople in Colombia
Expatriate footballers in Chile
Expatriate footballers in Colombia
Association football forwards
Argentine emigrants to Chile
Naturalized citizens of Chile